Common names: Piraja's lancehead.

Bothrops pirajai is a species of venomous snake, a pit viper in the subfamily Crotalinae of the family Viperidae. The species is endemic to Brazil. There are no subspecies that are recognized as being valid.

Etymology
The specific name, pirajai, is in honor of Brazilian parasitologist Pirajá da Silva, who in 1923 was director of the Bahia branch of the Instituto Butantan.

Description
It is stocky and terrestrial.

Geographic range
Bothrops pirajai is found in Brazil in central and southern Bahia. Possibly, it may also occur in Minas Gerais. The type locality given is "Ilheos, Bahia, Brazil".

Conservation status
The species B. pirajai is classified as endangered on the IUCN Red List for the following criteria: A1c (v2.3, 1994). This means that it is facing a high risk of extinction in the wild in the medium-term future due to population reduction in the form of an observed, estimated, inferred or suspected reduction of at least 20% over the last 10 years or three generations, whichever is the longer, based on a decline in area of occupancy, extent of occurrence and/or quality of habitat. 

The rainforest inhabited by this species is unfortunately decreasing in area and quality, while becoming increasingly fragmented through deforestation. The areas that have been cleared are mainly being used for cocoa plantations.

References

Further reading
Amaral A (1923). "New Genera and Species of Snakes". Proceedings of the New England Zoölogical Club 8: 85-105. (Bothrops pirajai,  new species, pp. 99–100).

External links

pirajai
Reptiles of Brazil
Reptiles described in 1923
Taxonomy articles created by Polbot